The 22nd Ryder Cup Matches were held at the Royal Lytham & St Annes Golf Club in Lytham St Annes, England. The United States team won the competition by a score of 12 to 7 points.

The event was the last time that a Great Britain and Ireland team would compete for the Ryder Cup. During the competition, officials from the PGA of America and the PGA of Great Britain and Ireland discussed the possibility of allowing players from continental Europe to participate in the Cup, and Jack Nicklaus also advocated this change in a meeting with Lord Derby.
The Deed of Trust that was struck with the PGA of Great Britain and Samuel Ryder was amended in time for the 1979 matches, and changed the popularity and competitive balance of the Ryder Cup.

Format
The Ryder Cup is a match play event, with each match worth one point.  The competition format was reduced in scope from the formats used from 1963 through 1975, with only 20 matches played instead of 32. The schedule of play was as follows:
Day 1 — 5 foursome (alternate shot) matches
Day 2 — 5 four-ball (better ball) matches
Day 3 — 10 singles matches
With a total of 20 points, 10 points were required to win the Cup.  All matches were played to a maximum of 18 holes.

Teams
Source:

Thursday's foursome matches

Friday's four-ball matches

Saturday's singles matches

Individual player records
Each entry refers to the win–loss–half record of the player.

Source:

Great Britain and Ireland

United States

References

Ryder Cup
Golf tournaments in England
Sport in the Borough of Fylde
Lytham St Annes
Ryder Cup
Ryder Cup
Ryder Cup
20th century in Lancashire